Deutsch-Griffen is a municipality in the district of Sankt Veit an der Glan in Austrian state of Carinthia.

Geography
It is situated in the eastern Nock Mountains, in a left tributary valley of the Gurk River on the Griffnerbach creek. The municipal area extends from the Gurk up to the Styrian border in the north. On the northern edge, there is a sparsely populated area along the Paalbach, which is cut off from the rest of the municipality and can only be reached in a very roundabout way. Therefore, it is locally considered to belong to the Flattnitz plateau, part of the neighbouring municipality of Glödnitz. In the west, Deutsch-Griffen borders on Albeck in the Feldkirchen District.

The municipal area comprises the only cadastral community Deutsch-Griffen made up of 25 villages and hamlets.

History

A locality in the March of Carinthia named Grivinne was already mentioned in a 927 deed. In 1043 Countess Hemma of Gurk donated a chapel at the site, the present-day St. Jacob parish church which passed to the Diocese of Gurk in 1157. The Romanesque structure was rebuilt as a fortified church in the 15th century, when it served as a refuge for the villagers during the Ottoman Wars.

The present-day municipality emerged in 1850. it was later called Deutsch-Griffen to distinguish it from Griffen in Völkermarkt District. In a 1973 administrative reform it was merged into a large municipality with neighbouring  Glödnitz and Weitensfeld but regained its independency after a local referendum in 1991.

Politics
Seats in the municipal assembly (Gemeinderat) as of 2015 local elections:
Freedom Party of Austria (FPÖ): 7
Austrian People's Party (ÖVP): 3
Social Democratic Party of Austria (SPÖ): 1

Twin town

Deutsch-Griffen is twinned with:
 Utenbach, part of Apolda, Germany, since 1993

References

Cities and towns in Sankt Veit an der Glan District